Canek may refer to:

 Canek, Itza Mayan rulers
Canek (chiefdom), a chiefdom of Yucatán
 El Canek, a Mexican masked lucha libre wrestler
 Jacinto Canek, Mayan revolutionary